Vitovlje Malo is a village in the municipality of Dobretići, Central Bosnia Canton, Bosnia and Herzegovina.

History
Vitovlje Malo was at one time in Skender Vakuf municipality, in the then country of Yugoslavia. Under the 1995 Dayton Agreement, which concluded the Bosnian War of 1992–1995, Bosnia and Herzegovina was divided into the two political entities Federation of Bosnia and Herzegovina and Republika Srpska. Skender Vakuf (by then renamed Kneževo) became part of the latter, and Vitovlje Malo of the former. Vitovlje Malo was accordingly transferred to the new municipality of Dobretići, in the Federation of Bosnia and Herzegovina.

Demographics
Population data from official censuses are:

References

Populated places in Dobretići